Solace is the third album by the New Zealand post-rock band Jakob. It was released through Midium Records in New Zealand on September 11, 2006 and on May 7, 2007 via Graveface Records in North America. The album was recorded, mixed and produced by David Holmes in May 2006 at Venn Productions in Auckland then mastered by Chris Winchcombe.  First single "Safety in Numbers" was announced in August 2006 and later released as a music video directed by Ed Davis.

Track listing
All songs written by Jakob.

Personnel
Jakob
 Jeff Boyle - guitar 
 Jason Johnston - drums 
 Maurice Beckett - bass

Additional musicians
 Tristan Dingemans - guitar, vocals on "Everything All of the Time"
 Dave Holmes - guitar on "Lonesome"
 H. Walker - samples on "Pneumonic"

Production 
 Jakob - mixing
 David Holmes - engineering, mixing, producer
 Chris Winchcombe - mastering 
 Julian Smith - artwork

References 

Jakob (band) albums
2006 albums